The northern blue-tongued skink (Tiliqua scincoides intermedia) or northern blue-tongued lizard is the largest and heaviest of the blue-tongued lizards (family Scincidae, genus Tiliqua). They are native to Australia and found almost exclusively in the Northern Region. They generally live around 20 years and are commonly kept as pets.

Appearance 
The northern blue-tongued skink (T. s. intermedia) is a subspecies of the common blue-tongued skink (T. s. scincoides). Similar to other blue-tongued lizards, the northern blue-tongued skink has very distinctive patterning.  Northerns tend to be a bright orange to soft peachy orange or even a yellowish colour with darker stripes along their sides and backs, with a lighter, creamier colour on their bellies.

They also have bright blue tongues often used to warn off or startle predators. Their legs are short and small compared to the length and width of their bodies. They grow to about 22 inches in total length.

Breeding 
The breeding season occurs once yearly in late spring. Mating is somewhat aggressive, with the male holding the female in place by biting her back. Damage to the scales and light bleeding are common.

The gestation period is roughly 100 days and they can produce as many as 20+ babies. Blue-tongued skinks are ovoviviparous and give birth to live young. The offspring appear as smaller versions of the adults with only slight variations to colouring, often darker and becoming a lighter and more vibrant shade with each shed. Babies are precocial and will wander off on their own and begin eating small insects and fruit a few days after birth. Adults are known to cannibalise their young.

Relatives 
The northern blue tongued skink is related to the eastern blue tongued skink (Tiliqua scincoides scincoides).

Gallery

External links and sources  

Honolulu Zoo
Basic Information Sheet: Northern Blue-Tongued Skink
 Northern Blue-tongued Skink
 Northern Blue-tongued Skink

Skinks of Australia
Reptiles described in 1955